Purius pilumnia is a moth in the family Erebidae. It was described by Stoll in 1780. It is found in Costa Rica, Panama, Venezuela, Suriname, French Guiana and Brazil.

References

Moths described in 1780
Phaegopterina